Carlo Coppola (17th century) was an Italian painter of the Baroque period, active in his natal city of Naples. He was a pupil of the battle-painter Aniello Falcone, and was adept at the same topic. He is said to have enjoyed himself during the day, thus spending his nights painting by candlelight, only within a short time to become blind.

References

Achille della Ragione - Carlo Coppola opera completa - Napoli 2010

Year of birth missing
Year of death missing
17th-century Italian painters
Italian male painters
Italian Baroque painters
Italian battle painters
Painters from Naples